The Cairns Taipans are an Australian professional basketball team based in Cairns, Queensland. The Taipans compete in the National Basketball League (NBL) and play their home games at the Cairns Convention Centre, known colloquially as "The Snakepit". The Taipans are the only not-for-profit club left in the league.

History

Early years (1999–2008)
The Taipans were founded in 1999, entering the National Basketball League (NBL) in place of the outgoing Newcastle Falcons for the 1999/2000 season. Led by head coach Rod Popp, the Taipans made their debut with a dismal 2–26 season record. The Taipans failed to qualify for the post-season in their first four seasons. In 2003/04, the Taipans played finals basketball for the first time. On 3 March 2004, the Taipans defeated the Perth Wildcats 103–96 in an elimination final at the Cairns Convention Centre. In winning their first final, the Taipans moved on to the quarter-finals, where they were defeated 110–88 by the West Sydney Razorbacks. After missing the finals in 2004/05, the Taipans made three straight finals appearances between 2005/06 and 2007/08.

Financial difficulties (2008–2009)
In December 2008, the Taipans were placed into voluntary administration. As a result, coach Alan Black was sacked and imports Larry Abney and Dave Thomas were let go. The rest of the team had to agree to a blanket 45 per cent pay cut for the rest of the season. Less than 12 months later, the Taipans were again in financial trouble – at the time, the club was almost $350,000 over budget and had only recorded a profit in one of the previous four months. In response, Basketball Australia and Cairns Regional Council vowed to continue supporting the cash-strapped Taipans.

NBL Grand Finalists (2011; 2015)

The 2010/11 season saw the Cairns Taipans create history as they finished the regular season in third place with a 16–12 record and advanced through to the 2011 NBL Grand Final series, reaching the championship deciding round for the first time behind star trio Ron Dorsey, Ayinde Ubaka and Daniel Dillon. There they faced the New Zealand Breakers, and after being thrashed in the series opener in Auckland, going down 85–67, the Taipans responded in Game 2 at home. They notched up a nail-biting 85–81 double-overtime win against the Breakers to send the series into a decider. It marked the first time in NBL history a play-off match was decided in double overtime. Cairns had looked set for a three-point win in normal time before a three-pointer from Breakers guard C. J. Bruton in the dying seconds sent the match into overtime. However, revenge came five minutes later when Dorsey wiped out the Breakers' three-point lead with no time to spare to force the match into double overtime. With momentum on their side, the Taipans were able to finish out the match on top. Dorsey's miraculous long three-pointer to send the game into double overtime has a special place in the club's history. The Breakers went on to win the 2010/11 NBL Championship with a 71–53 win in the decisive Game 3 in Auckland. The Taipans lacked the same spark in Game 3, with import pair Ubaka and Dorsey shooting 4-of-26 between them. Despite ultimately losing the series, Dorsey's heroics in Game 2 went down in Taipans folklore.

During the 2011 off-season, the star trio of Dorsey, Ubaka and Dillon all left Cairns to play for the Melbourne Tigers, each departing the Taipans after just one season. As a result, over the ensuing three seasons, the Taipans failed to return to the finals.

In February 2015, the Taipans clinched their first ever NBL minor premiership. They finished the 2014/15 regular season in first place with a 21–7 record, marking the first time since the now defunct Geelong Supercats in 1984, that a regional team has topped the regular season log. The Taipans also made history by using the same starting five of Scottie Wilbekin (Point guard), Cameron Gliddon (Shooting guard), Stephen Weigh (Small forward), Alex Loughton (Power forward) and Matt Burston (Centre) all season. They went on to reach the 2015 NBL Grand Final series, where they once again faced the New Zealand Breakers. Despite having home court advantage, the Taipans were defeated 86–71 in Game 1 before going on to lose at the buzzer in Game 2 in Auckland after a game-winning fade-away shot by Ekene Ibekwe lifted the Breakers to an 83–81 series-clinching win.

Honour Roll

Season by season

All-time records 
As of the end of the 2022–23 season

Summary

Players

All-time roster

Current roster

Retired jerseys

Notable past players 

  Shaun Bruce
  Matt Burston
  Martin Cattalini
  Torrey Craig
  Anthony Fisher
  Cameron Gliddon
  Aaron Grabau
  Devon Hall
  Nathan Jawai
  Phill Jones
  Jarrod Kenny
  Robert Loe
  Alex Loughton
 / Scott Machado
  Darnell Mee
  Mitchell McCarron
  James Mitchell
  Tony Mitchell
 / Andre Moore
  Cameron Oliver
  Kenny Payne
  Tony Rampton
 / Robert Rose
  Dusty Rychart
  Nathan Sobey
  Clint Steindl
  Anthony Stewart
  Lindsay Tait
  Marcus Timmons
  Cameron Tragardh
  Aaron Trahair
  Travis Trice
  Melo Trimble
  Ayinde Ubaka
  Jarrad Weeks
  Stephen Weigh
  Jayson Wells
  Scottie Wilbekin
  Jamar Wilson
  Mark Worthington
  Mitchell Young

References

External links 

 

 
National Basketball League (Australia) teams
Basketball teams in Queensland
Basketball teams established in 1999
1999 establishments in Australia
Sport in Cairns